Robin Cornelius Poole (born 10 January 1938) is a former Australian rules footballer who played with North Melbourne in the Victorian Football League (VFL).

Notes

External links 

Living people
1938 births
Australian rules footballers from Victoria (Australia)
North Melbourne Football Club players